Frederic Wanklyn Williams (1854–1940) was a notable New Zealand business proprietor, company director and community leader. He was born in Whakato, East Coast, New Zealand in 1854.

F W Williams was the eldest child of the Bishop of Waiapu. With Nathaniel Kettle he founded the stock and station agency, importers and general merchants Williams & Kettle with its headquarters in Napier.

From 1902 he served briefly as Mayor of Napier while he steered through a new loan to help develop the town. That done he resigned from the mayoralty in 1904 returning to his commercial interests but retaining his community involvement in the local harbour board between 1889 and 1919 together with the Hawke's Bay A & P Society as chairman and giving eight years service on the Hawke's Bay Education Board.
.

References

1854 births
1940 deaths
New Zealand stock and station agents
New Zealand businesspeople
People from the Gisborne District